Weissia squarrosa is a species of moss belonging to the family Pottiaceae.

It is native to Europe.

References

Pottiaceae